Mount Calvary Cemetery is located in north-central Davenport, Iowa, United States. It was officially platted by the Rev. A. Trevis, the pastor of St. Margaret's Church. At the time the cemetery lay outside the city of Davenport. Mount Calvary is in a section of the city that includes three other cemeteries: Davenport Memorial Park, Pine Hill, and Mount Nebo, which is located behind Pine Hill.

The first cemetery operated by the Catholic Church in Davenport was St. Mary's Cemetery in the west end.  Bishop Mathias Loras of Dubuque bought that property on January 17, 1849 from Judge G.C.R. Mitchell for $120.  The Mississippi and Missouri Railroad right of way was built through the southern section of the cemetery, and St. Mary's Church was erected on the property in 1867. Eventually the cemetery became too crowded and Holy Family Cemetery was established in the west end.  St. Mary's Cemetery was discontinued and the graves were moved to either Holy Family and Mount Calvary in the early 1900s.

Mount Calvary Cemetery contains the graves of the former bishops and priests of the Diocese of Davenport that surround a crucifix in the far end of the cemetery.  Three of the bishops were initially interred in Sacred Heart Cathedral before being re-interred here in 1930.  It also contains sections for the Carmelite Nuns, the Congregation of the Humility of Mary, the Sisters of Charity of the Blessed Virgin Mary and the orphans from St. Vincent's Home.

Notable burials
Isabel Bloom (1908–2001), artist
Edward Catich (1906–1979), noted calligrapher and artist
Henry Cosgrove (1834–1906), second Bishop of Davenport, 1884–1906
James J. Davis (1852–1926), third Bishop of Davenport, 1906–1926
Ralph Leo Hayes (1884–1970), fifth Bishop of Davenport, 1944–1966
Antoine LeClaire (1797–1861), co-founder of the city of Davenport
John McMullen (1832–1882), first Bishop of Davenport, 1881–1883
Marvin Mottet (1930-2016) social justice advocate
Jeremiah Henry Murphy (1835–1893), Mayor of Davenport; United States House of Representatives, 1883–1887
Gerald Francis O'Keefe (1918–2000), sixth Bishop of Davenport, 1966–1993
Hal Skelly (1891–1934) stage and screen actor

References

Geography of Davenport, Iowa
Cemeteries in Iowa
Cemeteries in the Quad Cities
Roman Catholic cemeteries in the United States
Roman Catholic Diocese of Davenport
Protected areas of Scott County, Iowa